Pterolophia chebana is a species of beetle in the family Cerambycidae. It was first discovered and described by Charles Joseph Gahan in 1894.

References

chebana
Beetles described in 1894